Mihai Cișmaș (born 18 November 1962) is a Romanian wrestler. He competed in the men's Greco-Roman 52 kg at the 1984 Summer Olympics.

References

1962 births
Living people
Romanian male sport wrestlers
Olympic wrestlers of Romania
Wrestlers at the 1984 Summer Olympics
Sportspeople from Piatra Neamț
World Wrestling Championships medalists